Sean Jones may refer to:

Sean Jones (defensive end) (born 1962), American football player
Sean Jones (safety) (born 1982), American football player
Sean Jones (trumpeter) (born 1978), with the Lincoln Center Jazz Orchestra
Sean Jones (singer/songwriter), Canadian
Sean Jones, lead guitarist for The Litter

See also
Shawn Jones (disambiguation)